The 144th New York State Legislature, consisting of the New York State Senate and the New York State Assembly, met from January 5 to April 16, 1921, during the first year of Nathan L. Miller's governorship, in Albany.

Background
Under the provisions of the New York Constitution of 1894, re-apportioned in 1917, 51 Senators and 150 assemblymen were elected in single-seat districts; senators for a two-year term, assemblymen for a one-year term. The senatorial districts consisted either of one or more entire counties; or a contiguous area within a single county. The counties which were divided into more than one senatorial district were New York (nine districts), Kings (eight), Bronx (three), Erie (three), Monroe (two), Queens (two) and Westchester (two). The Assembly districts were made up of contiguous area, all within the same county.

At this time there were two major political parties: the Republican Party and the Democratic Party. The Socialist Party, the Farmer–Labor Party, the Prohibition Party and the Socialist Labor Party also nominated tickets. The Prohibition Party endorsed the "dry" candidates for the Legislature, mostly Republicans, and nominated own candidates only where the major parties' candidates where "wet". In most of the Socialist strongholds in New York City, Democrats and Republicans nominated fusion candidates.

Elections
The New York state election, 1920, was held on November 2. Nathan L. Miller and Jeremiah Wood were elected Governor and Lieutenant Governor, both Republicans. The incumbent Governor Al Smith ran on the Democratic ticket for re-election, but was defeated by Miller with a plurality of about 75,000 votes out of more than two and a half million.

The other eight statewide elective offices up for election were also carried by the Republicans. The approximate party strength at this election, as expressed by the vote for governor, was: Republicans 1,335,000; Democrats 1,260,000; Socialists 172,000; Farmer-Labor 68,000; Prohibition 36,000; and Socialist Labor 5,000.

Only one woman was elected to the State Assembly: Marguerite L. Smith (Rep.), an athletics teacher, of Harlem, became the first woman to serve a second term in the Assembly.

Sessions
The Legislature met for the regular session at the State Capitol in Albany on January 5, 1921.

H. Edmund Machold (Rep.) was elected Speaker with 114 votes against 25 for Charles D. Donohue (Dem.) and 2 for Charles Solomon (Soc.).

Clayton R. Lusk (Rep.) was elected Temporary President of the State Senate with 38 votes against 8 for Jimmy Walker (Dem.) and one for Edmund Seidel (Soc.).

At the beginning of the session, resolutions were offered to expel Henry Jager, Samuel Orr and Charles Solomon from the Assembly for being Socialists and thus unfit to sit, which were referred to the Committee on the Judiciary. On January 12, another resolution was offered, contesting the eligibility of Henry Jager because he was alleged to be a resident of New Jersey.

On March 29, the Assembly Committee on the Judiciary presented its final report in the matter of the eligibility of Henry Jager. The majority (Rowe, Lown, T. K. Smith and Everett) concluded that Jager was a resident of Maywood, New Jersey, and therefore was ineligible for office under the provisions of the Public Officers Law of New York. A minority—in one report by Bloch and McKee, and another by Stitt and Ullman—concluded that Jager was a resident of Brooklyn. On the next day, Jager's seat was declared vacant by a vote of 77 to 62.

On April 4, the members who had offered the resolutions against Orr and Solomon attempted to call the resolutions up, which was voted down. Thus the resolutions remained on the table of the Committee on the Judiciary until the end of the session, without any action taken.

State Senate

Districts

Members
The asterisk (*) denotes members of the previous Legislature who continued in office as members of this Legislature. William T. Simpson, Martin G. McCue, Frank L. Wiswall, Warren T. Thayer, George R. Fearon, Allen J. Bloomfield and DeHart H. Ames changed from the Assembly to the Senate.

Note: For brevity, the chairmanships omit the words "...the Committee on (the)..."

Employees
 Clerk: Ernest A. Fay
 Sergeant-at-Arms: Charles R. Hotaling
 Assistant Sergeant-at-Arms: Henry Witbeck, Jr.
 Principal Doorkeeper: Lee V. Gardner
 First Assistant Doorkeeper: Frank Heilbron
 Stenographer: John K. Marshall

State Assembly
Note: For brevity, the chairmanships omit the words "...the Committee on (the)..."

Assemblymen

Employees
 Clerk: Fred W. Hammond
 Sergeant-at-Arms: Harry W. Haines
 Principal Doorkeeper: James B. Hulse
 First Assistant Doorkeeper: Walter S. Gay
 Second Assistant Doorkeeper: Charles H. Jackson
 Stenographer: George Munson
Postmaster: James H. Underwood

Notes

Sources
 Journal of the Senate (144th Session) (1921; Vol. I, January 5 to April 4)
 Journal of the Senate (144th Session) (1921; Vol. II, April 4 to 16)
 Journal of the Assembly (144th Session) (1921; Vol. I, January 5 to March 16)
 Journal of the Assembly (144th Session) (1921; Vol. II, March 16 to April 16)
 SENATE IS MEDIOCRE, SAYS CITIZENS UNION in NYT on July 15, 1921
 Manual for the Use of the Legislature of the State of New York prepared by Secretary of State John J. Lyons (1921)

144
1921 in New York (state)
1921 U.S. legislative sessions